Adam Stanislaw Wolanin (November 13, 1919 – October 26, 1987) was a Polish American soccer forward who was a member of the U.S. national team at the 1950 FIFA World Cup.  He is a member of the National Soccer Hall of Fame.

Professional career
Wolanin began his professional career with Polish First Division club Pogoń Lwów when he was seventeen.  When Germany invaded Poland, sparking World War II in September 1939, Wolanin fled to England where he played for English First Division club Blackpool.  However, he never cracked the first team before moving to the United States.  He eventually settled in Chicago where he played for the Maroons and A.A.C. Eagles of the National Soccer League of Chicago.  In 1950, he joined the Chicago Falcons, winning the 1953 National Challenge Cup with the team.

National team
In 1950, Wolanin was called up to the U.S. national team for the 1950 FIFA World Cup.  He played in the first U.S. game of the tournament, a 3–1 loss to Spain.

Wolanin was inducted, along with the rest of the 1950 U.S. World Cup team, into the National Soccer Hall of Fame in 1976 and the Illinois Soccer Hall of Fame in 1992. He is buried in Maryhill Catholic Cemetery & Mausoleum, in Chicago, Illinois.

References

External links

1919 births
1987 deaths
A.A.C. Eagles players
American soccer players
Blackpool F.C. players
Chicago Maroons soccer players
National Soccer Hall of Fame members
National Soccer League (Chicago) players
Sportspeople from Lviv
Sportspeople from Park Ridge, Illinois
Polish footballers
Polish emigrants to the United States
United States men's international soccer players
1950 FIFA World Cup players
Pogoń Lwów players
FC Spartak Moscow players
Soviet Top League players
Expatriate footballers in the Soviet Union
Association football forwards